Whistl (formerly TNT Post UK) is a postal delivery company based in Marlow, Buckinghamshire, England. The company primarily competes (and in some instances partners) with UK Mail, UPS, Parcelforce, DHL, Evri, Royal Mail and Yodel. According to the company, it processes about 25% of the mail in the United Kingdom, amounting to over 3.7 billion items per year in 2015.

Whistl provides services across business mail, parcel delivery, order fulfilment, contact centres and Doordrop Media both in the UK and internationally, processing around 50% of bulk business mail in the United Kingdom, handles more than 3.6 billion items a year and has over 1.5 million square feet of fulfilment space across the UK.

The company was a wholly-owned subsidiary of the Dutch delivery company PostNL until October 2015, when a management buyout was completed. PostNL remained a minority shareholder.

History
As TNT Post, the company was originally a subsidiary of the TNT Group. In May 2011, the group split to form TNT Express and PostNL. TNT Post UK became a subsidiary of PostNL, and an agreement was reached with TNT Express to continue using the TNT name until the end of 2014. The company began delivering in West London in April 2012, later rolling out its end to end service in Manchester and Liverpool.

The company rebranded as Whistl in September 2014.

In May 2015, Whistl announced that it would suspend door to door deliveries in London, Liverpool, and Manchester after the private equity investor LDC, a division of Lloyds Bank, decided not to fund further expansion citing "ongoing changes in postal market in the United Kingdom dynamics and the complexity of the regulatory landscape" and an attempt to stem losses.

Whistl confirmed on 10 June 2015 that the service would formally end, with 1,800 jobs at risk of redundancy. The company concentrated on processing and sorting mail and parcels, and reverted to using Royal Mail's "final mile" delivery service rather than its own. In October 2015, Whistl's management completed a buyout of the company from PostNL, although PostNL retained a 17.5% holding.

In June 2018, Whistl acquired Nottingham based Parcelhub and its sister company Mail Workshop.

In May 2019 Whistl acquired warehouse space in Harmondsworth, near Heathrow. The space was previously held by Keymail UK Ltd and will act as Whistl’s ‘international gateway’ for mail and parcel services in and out of the UK.

Whistl and UKP Worldwide teamed up in April 2020, to offer their customers a seamless customs clearance service for mail and parcel customers who operate internationally.

In December 2020, Whistl strengthened its order fulfilment offering by acquiring Clientbase, a privately held company based in Paignton, Devon, and offers fulfilment service for home shopping companies, including picking and packing, 140 seat contact centre capability, warehousing, returns handling and delivery.

Locations
Whistl has depots in the United Kingdom at Newtownabbey (Northern Ireland), Glasgow, Bolton, Bristol and Bedford. Whistl's head office is in Marlow, Buckinghamshire.

See also
Postal services in the United Kingdom

References

External links

Companies based in Buckinghamshire
Marlow, Buckinghamshire
Transport companies established in 2011
Postal organizations
Postal system of the United Kingdom
2011 establishments in England